The Copenhagen Towers are an American football team from Gentofte, Denmark. The club was founded in 1990, and have since competed in the National Ligaen, the highest division of American football in Denmark. 

The Copenhagen Towers are members of the Danish American Football Federation (DAFF), and have won the Danish Championship game (known as the Mermaid Bowl) a record ten times, in 1992, 1993, 1994, 1995, 2013, 2014, 2017, 2018, 2021, and 2022. The Towers reached the Mermaid Bowl for an eighth time in 1996 but lost the game to Roskilde Kings.

After a winless season in 1997, the Towers were relegated to Division 1 but were promoted again the following year. The Towers were again relegated in 2005 and spent the next season in Division 1. Since 2007, the Towers have been a regular feature in the National Ligaen, but they haven't been to the Mermaid Bowl since returning.

In 2012, the Towers went undefeated (10–0) in regular season. In 2013, the Towers returned to the Mermaid Bowl, which they won 28–21 against the Triangle Razorbacks.

Recent seasons
Recent seasons of the club:

 SF = National Ligaen semifinals
 MB = Mermaid Bowl (national final)

Youth teams
The Copenhagen Towers have youth teams for four age groups, Under-19, Under-16, Under-14, and Under-12.

Famous players
  J.R. Artozqui (2010-)
  Magnus Alexander Bitsch (2011-)

References

External links
 Official website
  Danish American Football Federation official website

American football teams in Denmark
American football teams established in 1990
Sports teams in Copenhagen
1990 establishments in Denmark